The Bayer designations a Hydrae and A Hydrae are distinct. Due to technical limitations, both designations link here. For the star
a Hydrae, see 6 Hydrae (HR 3431)
A Hydrae, see 33 Hydrae (HR 3814)

See also
 α Hydrae (Alphard)

Hydra (constellation)
Hydrae, a